Zain Khan Durrani is an Indian actor and poet, known for Mukhbir - The Story of a Spy, Bell Bottom (2021 film), and Kuchh Bheege Alfaaz.

Early life and education

Durrani was born in the Bagh e Mehtab suburb of Srinagar, Jammu and Kashmir, India into a Kashmiri Pathan family. He went to Burn Hall School, later joined Delhi Public School and graduated from Zakir Hussain College, Delhi University. He did stage acting at school, and has written poetry.

Career
Recently seen in the acclaimed series Mukhbir - The Story of a Spy 2022, where Zain played the lead as Harfan Bukhari. The series was very well received by the critics and audience alike. In 2017, Durrani worked the clapperboard for the film Shab. In 2018 Zain debuted to acquire a cult fan-base with his lead role as Alfaaz in the movie Kuchh Bheege Alfaaz.

Zain also appeared as a radio jockey on the programme  Lamhey with Zain   on Big 92.7 FM. In 2020 he played Lateef in Vidhu Vinod Chopra's film Shikara. He also played the role of hijacker Daljeet Singh Dodi in Bell Bottom 2021.

Filmography

Films

Web series

References

External links
 

Living people
Kashmiri people
Indian people of Kashmiri descent
Indian people of Pashtun descent
20th-century Indian male actors
Male actors in Hindi cinema
21st-century Indian male actors
Year of birth missing (living people)